The 1979 NSWRFL season was the 72nd season of Sydney's professional rugby league football competition, Australia's first. Twelve New South Wales Rugby Football League clubs competed for the J.J. Giltinan Shield and WD & HO Wills Cup during the season, which culminated in a grand final between the St. George and Canterbury-Bankstown clubs. NSWRFL teams also competed in the 1979 Amco Cup.

Season summary
Twenty-two regular season rounds were played from March till August, resulting in a top five of St. George, Parramatta, Cronulla-Sutherland, Western Suburbs and Canterbury-Bankstown who battled it out in the finals.

Parramatta's Ray Price was the 1979 season's Rothmans Medallist, and also won Rugby League Week’s player of the year award.

The 1979 season also saw the retirement from the League of future Australian Rugby League Hall of Fame inductee, Bob Fulton.

Teams
Twelve clubs, including six of 1908's foundation teams and another six from around Sydney competed for the NSWRFL premiership.

Ladder

Finals

Chart

Grand final
St. George finished 22 rounds as minor premiers with 17 wins and were straight into the grand final after defeating Parramatta in the major semi. Their Grand final opponents Canterbury, qualified after defeating Wests, Cronulla and Parramatta.

Television Coverage Dispute 
Under agreements in place at the time, the broadcast rights to the season saw one to two games on ABC TV on Saturday and/or Sunday afternoons, and a Sunday Night primetime replay and highlights of other matches on ATN-7 (part of the Seven's Big League programming). Under this agreement, the networks had rights to each broadcast and/or simulcast all six of the finals series games, under which they could either accept or decline the matches. 

The scene was set by an industrial relations dispute between camera and production crews and commercial broadcasting networks towards the end of 1979. This forced ATN-7 and the ABC into a shared feed arrangement using ABC production crew, but separate network commentary teams calling the game.

ATN-7, wore the financial costs as the designated broadcaster of the preliminary final, and provided the ABC with a clean feed of the match as agreed. However, the ABC refused to offer a clean feed to ATN-7 for the grand final, which caused massive controversy. ATN-7 then exercised their right as the primary broadcaster of the competition to broadcast the match between St George and Canterbury exclusively, deciding to source their own freelance crew and cover the match. The ABC then sued ATN-7, and the Australian Broadcasting Tribunal became involved, but ultimately the match remained exclusive to Seven's Big League.

Match 
The pre-game talk had been about the match-up of opposing half-backs Steve Morris and Steve Mortimer and the game didn't disappoint, beginning with a 40-metre flying break on a last tackle by Morris from deep in Dragons territory before he was cut down in a classic covering tackle by Mortimer.

The first half belonged to St. George with new fullback Brian Johnson scoring an easy opening try after taking a pass 10 metres out from the Canterbury line. Soon after, Rod Reddy, who was subduing his opponents with his experience and ruthlessness, put Morris into a gap. “Slippery” kicked ahead and the race was on. Mortimer had a head start and got there first but Morris tackled him into touch.

Soon afterwards Canterbury put a bomb up and toward the St. George in-goal. Brian Johnson was on hand to field the ball and returned it with a 60-metre run ended by a copybook tackle from his opposing fullback Stan Cutler. However the defence was opening up and it wasn't long before the Dragons scored their second try, with winger Mitch Brennan venturing infield and finding a gap courtesy of centre Robert Finch who slipped a short ball to Brennan 30 metres out. The strapping winger made a powerful run to score.
	
By now, Saints were carving Canterbury up with Morris, on his 20-metre line, putting Graeme Wynn into a gap. The lanky back rower ran 40 metres, leaving defenders in his wake. Next it was “Rocket” Reddy's turn when Morris, Wynn and Reddy combined down the right flank and exposed the Bulldogs defence. 'Rocket' handled twice in scoring a try under the posts. At half time the score was St George 17 – Canterbury 2.

Canterbury fought back gamely after the break. Steve Gearin and then Peter Mortimer crossed, with two further tries being disallowed. The St. George defence rallied and held from that point until Stan Cutler scored a third try out wide late in the match. St. George's goal-kicking second rower George Grant was the difference on the day, kicking four to ensure a 17–13 victory. Grant had kicked brilliantly all season, scoring 211 points in 1979.

The Dave Brown Medal for the best player on field, went to Steve Morris.

St. George 17 (Tries: Johnson, Brennan, Reddy. Goals: Grant 4.)

Canterbury-Bankstown 13 (Tries: Gearin, Mortimer, Cutler. Goals: Gearin 2.)

Player statistics
The following statistics are as of the conclusion of Round 22.

Top 5 point scorers

Top 5 try scorers

Top 5 goal scorers

See also
 Mortimer family

References

External links
Rugby League Tables – Season 1979 The World of Rugby League
Results:1971-80 at rabbitohs.com.au
1979 J J Giltinan Shield and WD & HO Wills Cup at rleague.com
NSWRFL season 1979 at rugbyleagueproject.org
1979 Grand final at Dragons History site

New South Wales Rugby League premiership
NSWRFL season